Bond County is a county located in the U.S. state of Illinois. As of the 2020 census, the population was 16,725. Its county seat is Greenville.

Bond County is included in the St. Louis, MO-IL Metropolitan Statistical Area.

History
Bond County was formed in 1817 out of Madison County. It was named for Shadrach Bond, who was then the delegate from the Illinois Territory to the United States Congress, and who thereupon became the first governor of Illinois, serving from 1818 to 1822.

The county's primary city, Greenville, had a post office from 1819 and was incorporated as a town in 1855 and as a city in 1872.  A few possible reasons have been put forth for the naming of the town.  Some think the town was named after Greenville, North Carolina, which had been named after Revolutionary War general Nathanael Greene.  Others say that Greenville was named by early settler Thomas White because it was "so green and nice."  A third possibility is that Greenville was named after Green P. Rice, the town's first merchant.

In 1824, a vote taken on slavery in Bond County had received 240 votes against and 63 votes for slavery. While Illinois was not a slave state, it was adjacent to slave states, Missouri and Kentucky, and did allow the continued use of "indentured servants," a process many slaveowners used to keep their slaves even in a free state.

In Bond County, at one point 14 slaves were registered to eight owners. One slave, Silas Register, took his last name from the act of being registered at the county clerk's office. Register was the last known Bond County slave to survive; he died in 1872 at the age of 76. A few of the slaves are buried in the county with the families they were indentured to. One former slave, Fanny, was free after her owners moved out of the state and worked in the town so that she could buy her husband, Stephen, at auction in Missouri.

During the 1840s, Bond County played host to a few people conducting slaves to freedom on the Underground Railroad. Teacher T.A. Jones lived in Reno and in 2008, a letter in which he told of his Underground Railroad activities was discovered in a staircase in Sparta. Slaves were often spirited from Missouri, sometimes through Carlyle to Bond County. Rev. John Leeper was able to disguise his Underground Railroad activities due to his milling business. Dr. Henry Perrine practiced medicine near Greenville and helped with the secret railroad activities. Rev. George Denny's house was found in the 1930s to conceal a secret chamber that had been used in the Railroad.

Greenville University was founded as Almira College in 1855. In 1941, college president H.J. Long "declared the founding of Almira and Greenville ran parallel, for both were founded on prayer."

When Abraham Lincoln and Stephen Douglas gave speeches in Greenville in 1858 during a campaign for the United States Senate, Douglas said: "Ladies and gentlemen it gives me great and supreme gratification and pleasure to see this vast concourse of people assembled to hear me upon this my first visit to Old Bond."  The Illinois State Register reported of the occasion: "I've seen many gatherings in Old Bond county but I never saw anything equal to this and I never expect to."

Women in Bond County could vote for the first time in 1914.On November 21, 1915, the Liberty Bell passed through Greenville on its nationwide tour returning to Pennsylvania from the Panama-Pacific International Exposition in San Francisco.  After that trip, the Liberty Bell returned to Pennsylvania and will not be moved again.

The Greenville Public Library was established as a Carnegie library and is on the National Register of Historic Places.  Hogue Hall at Greenville College, demolished in 2008, also formerly appeared on the National Register.

On April 18, 1934, during the Great Depression, a group of 500 protesters marched to the Illinois Emergency Relief Commission to lodge complaints about the delivery of emergency supplies from the state and federal governments.

Ronald Reagan visited Greenville on the campaign trail in the 1980s and gave a speech on the courthouse lawn.  Barack Obama, the junior Senator from Illinois elected as President in November 2008, also visited Greenville while campaigning for his Senate seat in 2004, in a visit hosted by the Bond County Democrats.

Geography

Adjacent counties
 Montgomery County – north
 Fayette County – east
 Clinton County – south
 Madison County – west

Major highways
  Interstate 70
  U.S. Route 40
  Illinois Route 127
  Illinois Route 140
  Illinois Route 143

Climate and weather

Demographics

As of the 2020 United States census, there were 16,725 people, 6,359 households, and 4,033 families residing in the county. The racial makeup of the county was 86.4% white, 6.4% black or African American, 0.3% American Indian, 0.6% Asian, 2.2% from other races, and 4.0% from two or more races. Those of Hispanic or Latino origin made up 3.6% of the population. The most commonly reported ancestries were German (28.9%),  Irish (13.4%), English (9.3%), and American (9.2%).

Of the 6,359 households, 25.6% had children under the age of 18 living with them, 53.8% were married couples living together, 7.4% had a female householder with no husband present, 36.6% were non-families. 29.9% of all households were made up of individuals, and 15.9% had someone living alone who was 65 years of age or older. The average household size was 2.32 and the average family size was 2.87.

19.1% of the population was under 18 years of age, 9.2% was between 18 and 24, 37.7% was between 15 and 44, and 18.8% was over 65. The median age was 42.5 years. For every 100 females there were 111.0 males.

The median income for a household in the county was $53,568 and the median income for a family was $69,917. Males had a median income of $41,231 versus $26,408 for females. The per capita income for the county was $27,274. About 6.6% of families and 13.6% of the population were below the poverty line, including 17.0% of those under age 18 and 7.8% of those age 65 or over.

In terms of education, 33.2% of the population had attained a high school or equivalent degree, 13.2% had a bachelor's degree, and 8.5% had a graduate or professional degree.

2020 Census

Education
 Bond County Community Unit School District 2
 Carlyle Community Unit School District 1
 Highland Community Unit School District 5
 Hillsboro Community Unit School District 3
 Mulberry Grove Community Unit School District 1
 Vandalia Community Unit School District 203
 Greenville University

Communities

City
 Greenville

Villages

 Donnellson
 Keyesport
 Mulberry Grove
 Old Ripley
 Panama
 Pierron
 Pocahontas
 Smithboro
 Sorento

Townships
Bond County is divided into these nine townships:

 Burgess
 Central
 Lagrange
 Mills
 Mulberry Grove
 Old Ripley
 Pleasant Mound
 Shoal Creek
 Tamalco

Unincorporated Communities

 Ayers
 Beaver Creek
 Bunje
 Dudleyville
 Durley
 Gilmore
 Hamburg
 Hookdale
 Keyesport Landing
 Paisley Corners
 Pleasant Mound
 Reno
 Stubblefield
 Tamalco
 Woburn

Politics
Bond is a strongly Republican county. Only two Democrats have gained an absolute majority of the county's vote since at least 1880 – Franklin D. Roosevelt in 1932 and Lyndon Johnson in 1964. Bill Clinton was the last Democrat to win the county, in 1996, though local Senator Barack Obama came within 100-plus votes in 2008.

See also
 National Register of Historic Places listings in Bond County, Illinois

References

External links
 County Website
 United States Census Bureau 2007 TIGER/Line Shapefiles
 United States Board on Geographic Names (GNIS)
 United States National Atlas

 
Illinois counties
1817 establishments in Illinois Territory
Populated places established in 1817
Populated places on the Underground Railroad
Pre-statehood history of Illinois